Lill is a surname. When borne by Estonian individuals, it means "flower". People with the surname Lill include:

 Alfred John Lill, Jr. (1880-1956), American former president of the Amateur Athletic Union and member of the United States Olympic Committee 
 Alick Lill (1904–1987), Australian rules footballer
 Andreas Lill (born 1965), German drummer (Vanden Plas)
 Anne Lill (born 1946), Estonian classical philologist and translator
 Darren Lill (born 1982),  South African racing cyclist
 Denis Lill (born 1942), British actor
 Eduard Lill (1830–1900), Austrian engineer and army officer
 Erkki Lill (born 1968), Estonian curler and curling coach
 Harri Lill (born 1991), Estonian curler
 Heino Lill (born 1944), Estonian basketball coach and basketball player
 Ivo Lill (born 1953), Estonian glass artist
 Jim Lill (born 19??), American country musician
 John Lill (born 1933), Australian cricketer
 John Lill (born 1944), British classical pianist
 Kristiine Lill (born 1971), Estonian curler and curling coach
 Mari Lill (born 1945), Estonian actress
 Mari-Liis Lill (born 1983), Estonian actress
 Märt-Matis Lill (born 1975), Estonian composer
 Martin Lill (born 1972), Estonian curler and curling coach
 Mickey Lill (1936–2004), English footballer
 Paul Lill (1882–1942), Estonian military officer and politician
 Pille Lill (born 1962), Estonian opera singer
 PJ van Lill (born 1983), Namibian rugby union player

See also
 Lille
 Lilly (disambiguation)

Estonian-language surnames